Sartrithrips is a genus of thrips in the family Phlaeothripidae.

Species
 Sartrithrips areius
 Sartrithrips bapto
 Sartrithrips luctator
 Sartrithrips mars
 Sartrithrips popinator
 Sartrithrips pyctus
 Sartrithrips vesper

References

Phlaeothripidae
Thrips
Thrips genera